Vima Nyingthig, "Seminal Heart of Vimalamitra", in Tibetan Buddhism is one of the two "seminal heart" collections of the menngagde cycle Dzogchen, the other one being "Seminal Heart of the Dakini" (mkha' 'gro snying thig). Traditionally the teachings are ascribed to Vimalamitra, but they were codified and collated by their Tibetan discoverers in the 11th and 12th century. The main discoverer of the Vima Nyingthig was Zhangtön Tashi Dorjé.

History
The Vima Nyingthig is founded principally on the seventeen tantras and the Troma tantra. It is the teachings both for and of the panditas, brought to Tibet by Vimalamitra.

Contents
The Vima Nyingtik itself consists of three sections:
 tantras (rgyud), which refer to the Seventeen Tantras;
 āgamas (lung), which are largely Tibetan syntheses;
 upadēśavargas (man ngag); these refer to 119 treatises of pith advice.

Troma Tantra

The "Troma Tantra" or the "Ngagsung Tromay Tantra" otherwise known as the "Ekajaṭĭ Khros Ma'i rGyud"  focuses on rites of the protector, Ekajati.

Seventeen tantras

The "Seventeen tantras of the esoteric instruction cycle" are supports. These seventeen tantras are to be found in the Nyingma Gyubum ("Canon of the Ancient School"), volumes 9 and 10, folio numbers 143–159 of the edition edited by Jamyang Khyentse Rinpoche, commonly known as Dilgo Khyentse (Thimpu, Bhutan, 1973), reproduced from the manuscript preserved at Tingkye Gonpa Jang  Monastery in Tibet.

Lineage
Rigdzin Kumaradza was a senior disciple of Melong Dorje (1243–1303). Kumaradza studied with the grand master Orgyenpa (1230–1309), who conveyed teachings of "Vimalamitra's Seminal Heart" upon him.

Testaments of the knowledge-holders

"The Posthumous Teachings of the Vidyadhara" are found in the Vima Nyingtik. These are the last testaments of the early vidyadharas: Garab Dorje, Mañjuśrīmitra, Sri Singha and Jnanasutra. These testaments are post-humous as they were delivered by the vidhyadhara to their senior disciple from within a thigle of the Five Pure Lights in their rainbow body. In this tradition, the thigle is understood to be comparable to a pure land or mandala.  These were first compiled by Vimalamitra in his five series (which consisted of the series of: Golden Letters, Copper Letters, Variegated Letters, Conch Shell Letters and Turquoise Letters). These posthumous teaching belong to the series of the "Golden Letters".

Last testament of Garab Dorje

"The Three Statement That Strike the Essential Points" or "The Three Vajra Verses"

Last testament of Manjushrimitra

"The Six Meditation Experiences"

Last testament of Śrī Singha

"The Seven Nails"

Last testament of Jñānasūtra

"The Four Methods of Establishing Absorption"

Vima Nyingtik: Fourth Volume

The Eleven Themes
Scheidegger (2009: p. 43) in a recent work discusses the first four of "The Eleven Themes" a work composed by Longchenpa contained in the fourth volume of the Vima Nyingtik.

Notes

References

Sources

External links
"Vima_Nyingtik" @ Rigpa Shedra

Dzogchen texts
Nyingma texts
Nyingma tantras